Vasilyevka is a rural locality (a selo) in Naumovsky Selsoviet, Sterlitamaksky District, Bashkortostan, Russia. The population was 655 as of 2010. There are 9 streets.

Geography 
Vasilyevka is located 20 km south of Sterlitamak (the district's administrative centre) by road. Kantyukovka is the nearest rural locality.

References 

Rural localities in Sterlitamaksky District